State Super, is one of the oldest superannuation funds in Australia beginning in New South Wales in 1919 with the creation of the State Superannuation Scheme for salaried public servants. It is in the Australian Prudential Regulation Authority (APRA) Top 15 super funds in Australia with close to $42 billion AUD in assets as at 30 June 2020 and 96,180 members. State Super members are current and previous NSW government employees and public sector workers such as police, teachers, nurses and more.

State Super, also known as SAS Trustee Corporation, closed the schemes to new members in the late 1980s and early 1990s but continues to manage the defined benefit super and pension schemes for all its members and supports them with retirement planning seminars, interviews and phone support. State Super employees are guided by five well-defined member beliefs and are committed to always acting in members' best interests.

State Super acknowledged its centenary in 2019 with the announcement of the State Super Scholarship, which provides valuable financial support to successful applicants who are completing a Masters Degree or PhD at a NSW university. Work completed by State Super Scholarship recipients is intended to provide a pipeline of research into the superannuation, retirement and pension needs of public sector workers in Australia.

Located in Clarence Street, Sydney, NSW, State Super is led by Chief Executive Officer John Livanas and his executive team including Chief Investment Officer Charles Wu . Chairperson Nicholas Johnson heads the State Super Board.

State Super schemes
State Super is the Trustee of the following defined benefit schemes: State Authorities Superannuation Scheme (SASS), State Superannuation Scheme (SSS), and Police Superannuation Scheme (PSS). State Super also manages the State Authorities Non-contributory Superannuation Scheme (SANCS), which provides additional benefits to members of SASS, SSS and PSS. The State Super Pooled Fund comprises the assets of all four schemes.

Members 
State Super continues to look after past and present public sector and government workers of NSW and serves 96,180 members as at June 2020.

Diversified portfolio of Australian and International investments 
State Super owns a diversified portfolio of Australian and international assets, including a range of infrastructure, transport, energy and property assets.  

These include shopping centres in Tweed Heads, Smithfield (QLD) and Plumpton, office buildings in North Sydney, Sydney CBD and Macquarie Park in Sydney's north west and an industrial estate in Port Melbourne. State Super is also part owner of Westfield Knox and the Regents Park Industrial Estate. 

Aviation transport assets in which State Super holds a stake include Birmingham Airport, Bristol Airport, Melbourne Airport, Launceston Airport and Queensland Airports Limited which owns and operates Gold Coast Airport, Townsville Airport, Mount Isa Airport and Longreach Airport. 

The fund also owns a stake in the Stockholm Arlanda Express train in Sweden, Flinders Ports in South Australia, and in Victoria, Port of Geelong and the Peninsula Link toll road.

State Super owns energy assets in England including Yorkshire Water and the Northern Gas Networks and State Super is also part owner of Queensland’s AllGas distribution network.

Key people
Chairperson: Nicholas Johnson

Chief Executive Officer: John Livanas

External links
State Super
State Authorities Superannuation Scheme (SASS)
State Superannuation Scheme (SSS)
Police Superannuation Scheme (PSS)
State Authorities Non-contributory Superannuation Scheme (SANCS)

References 

Australian companies established in 1919
Financial services companies established in 1919
Superannuation funds in Australia